Beira-Mar can refer to:

Football teams
S. C. Beira-Mar, a Portuguese team from Aveiro
Beira-Mar (Ribeira Grande), a team from the city of Ribiera Grande in Cape Verde
Beira-Mar (Tarrafal), a team from the town of Tarrafal in Cape Verde
Beira-Mar (Maoi Island), a Cape Verdean team that plays in the Maio Island League

Other
Ogun Beira-Mar, an aspect of the deity Ogoun in Afro-Brazilian mythology
Beira-Mar (film), a 2015 Brazilian film

See also
Beira (mythology),  a Celtic goddess